Ayşe Kuru (born 2 January 1974) is a Turkish former women's football defender. She was part of the Turkish women's national team between 1996 and 2001.

Playing career

Club
Kuru obtained her license for Dinarsuspor on 30 August 1996. She played in the Turkish Women's Football League, and was captain of her team. After Dinarsuspor withdrew from the league, she transferred to Zara Ekinlispor in August 1999, and then moved to Marshall Boyaspor in November the same year. 

Kuru became the first ever Turkish women's footballer to play abroad after she moved to Germany to join FCR Duisburg.

International
Kuru was admitted to the Turkey women's national football team and debuted at the UEFA Women's Euro 1997 qualification - Group 8 match against Bulgaria on 21 October 1995. She played in five matches of the qualification round. She played in seven matches of the 1999 FIFA Women's World Cup qualification - Group 7, in three matches of the 
1998 Women's Harvest Cup, in six matches of the UEFA Women's Euro 2001 qualification - Group 8 and in one match of the 2003 FIFA Women's World Cup qualification - Group 8. She capped 30 times in total for the women's national team.

References

Living people
1974 births
People from Cide
Sportspeople from Kastamonu
Turkish women's footballers
Women's association football defenders
Turkey women's international footballers
Dinarsuspor players
Turkish expatriate women's footballers
Turkish expatriate sportspeople in Germany
FCR 2001 Duisburg players